USM Blida is a football club based in Blida, Algeria, which plays in the Algerian Ligue Professionnelle 2. This chronological list comprises all those who have held the position of manager of the first team of USM Blida from 1932, when the first professional manager was appointed, to the present day.

The first manager of USM Blida was Abdelkader Hadef, who joined the club in 1932 as a player-manager. The current manager is Karim Madjour, who took over the club in February 2022.

List of USM Blida managers

1932–1999

1999–
Only first-team competitive matches are counted. Wins, losses and draws are results at the final whistle; the results of penalty shoot-outs are not counted.
Statistics are complete up to and including the match played on 26 June 2021.

Key
M = matches played; W = matches won; D = matches drawn; L = matches lost; GF = goals for; GA = goals against; Win % = percentage of total matches won

References

USM Blida
USM Alger
USM Blida